Marcel Holmberg (October 27, 1981, Santiago, Chile) ICA Chartered Architect, founder of MAARC Studio, previously director and founder of PWD Architecture China.

Career
Marcel Holmberg founded MAARC Studio in 2009, now based in Berlin, he oversees the design of all projects in Europe, Asia and South America. 

Previously worked with german architects Ole Scheeren in Berlin / Beijing and with Eike Becker in Berlin. 

In China he founded and led his own office; PWD Architecture, designing and building a series of mixed use projects. Later collaborating with french office AREP architecture in the design of Transport Oriented Developments across China. 

In Chile, he collaborated with architects Marco Polidura, Iñaki Volante and Javier Bize on diverse typologies and participated as a permanent assistant teacher for university workshops.

Personal Background

Descendant of a Swedish-German family from the south of Chile, grew up and spent his formative years in Oakland, California and later in Santiago, Chile. After obtaining his Masters in Architecture he relocated to Beijing. 

He is currently residing in Berlin.

References

External links
MAARC

Chilean architects
1981 births
Living people